Coliadinae, the sulphurs or yellows, are a subfamily of butterflies with about 300 described species.

There are 36 species in North America, where they range from Mexico to northern Canada. In most species, males are easily distinguished from females. For example, in the genera Colias and Gonepteryx), males exhibit brilliant UV reflections that the females lack.

Systematics
The Coliadinae can be arranged in the three traditional tribes and a basal lineage, with one genus of unclear placement. The taxa—including some selected species—are arranged here in the presumed phylogenetic sequence, from the most ancient lineages to the most modern ones:

Basal lineage
 Kricogonia Reakirt, 1863
 Nathalis Boisduval, [1836]

Euremini
 Terias Swainson, 1821
 Pyrisitia Butler, 1870
 Abaeis Hübner, [1819]
 Eurema Hübner, [1819] – grass yellows
 Leucidia Doubleday, [1847]
 Teriocolias Roeber 1909

Goniopterygini
 Dercas Doubleday, [1847] – sulphurs
 Gonepteryx Leach, [1815] – brimstones

Coliadini
 Catopsilia Hübner, [1819] – emigrants
 Colias Fabricius, 1807 – clouded yellows
 Zerene Hübner, [1819]
 Zerene eurydice – California dogface butterfly
 Anteos Hübner, [1819] – angled-sulphurs
 Aphrissa Butler, 1873
 Phoebis Hübner, [1819]
 Phoebis sennae – cloudless sulphur
 Phoebis avellaneda – red-splashed sulphur
 Prestonia Schaus, 1920
Prestonia clarki Schaus, 1920
 Rhabdodryas Godman & Salvin, [1889]
Rhabdodryas trite (Linnaeus, 1758)

Incertae sedis
 Gandaca Moore, [1906]
 Gandaca harina (Horsfield, [1829]) – tree yellow

Footnotes

References

  (2006): Tree of Life Web Project - Coliadinae. Version of November 16, 2006. Retrieved August 7, 2008
  (2005): Extreme ultraviolet sexual dimorphism in jumping spiders (Araneae: Salticidae). Biological Journal of the Linnean Society 89(3): 397-406.  (HTML abstract)

 
Taxa named by William John Swainson
Butterfly subfamilies